Colourbox is the debut mini-album from Colourbox, released by 4AD in November 1983. MAD 315 is the album's catalogue number, used to distinguish it from their 1985 self-titled album, although the mini-album is sometimes referred to as Horses Fucking due to the cover image. It was reissued on CD in 1986 with four additional tracks compiled from the band's singles.

The track "The Official Colourbox World Cup Theme" was originally intended as a football theme, and almost lived up to its name when it was up for consideration as the theme for BBC's World Cup Grandstand during the broadcast of the 1986 FIFA World Cup in Mexico. That honour, however, went to the song "Aztec Lightning" by Heads.

"Looks Like We're Shy One Horse"/"Shoot Out" features samples from the 1968 Spaghetti Western Once Upon a Time in the West.

Track listing 
 1983 vinyl LP
 Side A
 "Shotgun" – 5:40
 "Keep on Pushing" – 5:18
 Side B
 "Nation" – 9:58
 "Justice" – 4:51

 1986 CD reissue
 "The Official Colourbox World Cup Theme" (12" version) – 5:27
 "Baby I Love You So" (12" version) – 6:43
 "Looks Like We're Shy One Horse"/"Shoot Out" – 7:58
 "Shotgun" – 5:40
 "Keep on Pushing" – 5:18
 "Nation" – 9:58
 "Justice" – 4:51
 "Breakdown" (12" version) – 7:50

References 

1983 debut albums
4AD albums
Colourbox albums